Ian Ross (born 27 August 1974) is a Scottish former professional footballer, who played for Motherwell, St Mirren, Partick Thistle, Alloa Athletic and Stranraer in the Scottish leagues.

2008 he was appointed Scottish FA Player & Coach Development Officer for the Central Region and University of Stirling 1st Team Head Coach in 2009 until December 2011.  From 2012, he has been the dedicated coach for the Scottish Football Association's Performance Schools project based at Graeme High School in Falkirk.

References

External links

1974 births
Living people
Scottish footballers
Scottish Football League players
Scottish Premier League players
Bathgate Thistle F.C. players
Motherwell F.C. players
St Mirren F.C. players
Partick Thistle F.C. players
Alloa Athletic F.C. players
Stranraer F.C. players
Association football midfielders
Sportspeople from Broxburn, West Lothian
Footballers from West Lothian